Bar-Or and Bar Or may refer to:

People
 Dorit Bar Or (born 1975), Israeli actress
 Nimrod Shapira Bar-Or (born 1989), Israeli swimmer
 Gal Bar-Or (born 1967), Israeli entrepreneur
 Yaakov Bar-Or, born Jacob Breuer, was an assistant prosecutor at the trial of Trial of Adolf Eichmann in 1961.